Yeazell is a surname. Notable people with the surname include:

Ruth Yeazell (born 1947), American literary critic
Stephen C. Yeazell, American legal scholar